Waylett is a surname. Notable people with the surname include:

 Harriet Waylett (1798–1851), English actress and theatre manager
 Jamie Waylett (born 1989), British actor

See also
 Dunton Wayletts, hamlet in Essex